The eastern sand skink (Trachylepis depressa) is a species of skink found in South Africa.

References

Trachylepis
Reptiles described in 1854
Taxa named by Wilhelm Peters